Service-learning is an educational approach that combines learning objectives with community service in order to provide a pragmatic, progressive learning experience while meeting societal needs.

Service-learning involves students (k-12, higher ed) in service projects to apply classroom learning for local agencies that exist to effect positive change in the community. The National Youth Leadership Council defines service learning as "a philosophy, pedagogy, and model for community development that is used as an instructional strategy to meet learning goals and/or content standards."

Author Barbara Jacoby defines service-learning as "...a form of experiential education in which students engage in activities that address human and community needs together with structured opportunities for reflection designed to achieve desired learning outcomes."

Service learning is a combination of what we know as formal education and applying that learning in a service oriented way. It is a type of educational philosophy that requires the student to demonstrate their knowledge, thus connecting the cognitive to the emotive and resulting in better learning outcomes. It incorporates personal passions with intellect, empowering students to find their passion and exercise useful ways to engage in real world problems. It is a connected learning experience, linking personal development with cognitive development and touching feelings as well as thought. Students take the ideas they learn about in theory and connect them to real problems in practice, creating viable solutions for long term transformation in society. The classroom becomes a place where thought is connected to passion, evoking real world change.

This philosophy incorporates the core ideas of progressivism such as democracy, experimental education, and individual rights. It also includes Pragmatism, a philosophy inspired by William James stating that learning should be useful and that information is only valuable if it does something. In recent years this theory is gaining traction as professors and academic advisers review the learning outcomes of students that are encouraged to find and use their passions to exercise solutions to the problems around them. This is made more possible by the ideas of democracy and individual freedoms that enable citizens to freely use their passions and intellect to become social entrepreneurs; individuals who undertake a social problem and become transformative forces in society.

Typology 
As defined by Robert Sigmon, 1994:

 Service-LEARNING: Learning goals primary; service outcomes secondary.
 SERVICE-Learning: Service outcomes primary; learning goals secondary.
 service learning: Service and learning goals completely separate.
 SERVICE-LEARNING: Service and learning goals of equal weight and each enhances the other for all participants.

As stated above, there are four different categories that define various levels of Service-Learning that Sigmon created, using graphical representations of the two words. Each have their different advantages, and their different purposes in the world of Service-Learning. An activity such as students offering community service to an agency would classify as “SERVICE-learning”, because the service aspect is taking the forefront of the work. If a student, or a group of students studies the observation of community groups, or something along those lines, it would be classified as “service-LEARNING”, because the learning aspect is the main focus of that type of project. Now “service learning” is a little different than the last two, as the service and learning aspects are separate from each other, with neither taking the spotlight. An example of this definition would be volunteer programs within a college, that have no real connection to the academics they are pursuing. When both service and learning are of equal weight, it is seen as “SERVICE-LEARNING”, as both are being put together instead of being separated, or one taking the main focus over the other. An example of this type of service could be a group of students volunteering to serve in a certain area, but also studying the subject while putting in their service, and coming up with ideas to help improve the work they are doing. All of these variants come underneath the wing of Service-Learning, and each of them can be used at different times, depending on the circumstances.

Examples of service-learning typologies 

Service-learning, as defined by Robert Sigmon, "occurs when there is a balance between learning goals and service outcomes." As follows, there are various methods of hands-on learning that fall into this category, these include:
 Volunteerism: Volunteerism is acts of service performed out of free will without expectation of recompense and is generally altruistic in nature; the main beneficiaries (at least in a visible sense) are generally those served by the student.
 Community Service: Community service is quite similar to volunteerism, the main difference being that it is said to "involve more structure and student commitment than do volunteer programs."
 Internship: Internships can provide students with experience in various fields of work; however, unlike volunteerism and community service, students gain a more measurable benefit from this aspect of service learning.
 Field Education: Field education, like internships, is generally more materially beneficial to the student. Field education involves programs that, "provide students with co‐curricular service opportunities that are related, but not fully integrated, with their formal academic studies."

The purpose of service learning is, in essence, to, "equally benefit the provider and the recipient of the service as well as to ensure equal focus on both the service being provided and the learning that is occurring." Volunteerism, community service, internships, and field education all exemplify, in some way or another, the core value of service learning, as all of them benefit the student as well as the one they served to an equal degree, the only difference being how material the benefit is. These methods also tend to focus on ensuring that the student not only serves, but learns something, whether it is interpersonal skills, work experience in their future field, or a change in how they view themselves and others. Service-learning also addresses the critique of higher education to function more as a gatekeeper and reifier of social stratifications rather than a knowledge-making enterprise that benefits society. Service-learning allows for publicly engaged scholarship (PES), which allows students to collaborate with their local communities to promote peace and social betterment. The value of reciprocity between students and community is prioritized through relationships that are not hierarchical; they are collaborative.

eService-Learning 
eService-Learning is either an online course that embeds service-learning into the curriculum or a traditional course where the service-learning action takes place online. 

Due to the pandemic as well as the popularity of online courses, many courses are being offered with service-learning as a requirement or option.  There are 4 types based on Faulconer's research.  Type I eService-Learning has online course curriculum that involves some type of onsite service.  Type II eService-Learning is an onsite course with online service-learning. Type III eService-Learning is a hybrid (traditional and online format) mixed with online service. Type IV eService-Learning (extreme service learning) – is fully online.

History
In Service-learning: History, Theory, and Issues, Bruce W. Speck and Sherry Lee Hoppe say that John Dewey's writings on the active nature of understanding and the benefits of and conditions for participatory democracy "...provide an early theoretical foundation for a pedagogy in which students cooperatively engage actual social problems." In Building partnerships for service-learning, Barbara Jacoby writes that Service-learning "is based on the work of researchers and theorists on learning, including John Dewey, Jean Piaget, Kurt Lewin, Donald Schon, and David Kolb, who believe that we learn through combinations of action and reflection."

In 1979 Robert Sigmon called for a more precise definition in Service-Learning: Three Principles, in which he said the term, which was relatively new, was being used to describe a number of different volunteer actions and experiential education programs.
Sigmon wrote that, in the late 1960s, the Southern Regional Education Board (SREB) popularized a service-learning internship model, that defined service-learning as "the integration of the accomplishment of a public task with conscious educational growth." Many faculty of color have led PES movements; they have quickly applied their academic expertise to their local communities. Similarly, their service work in the local communities has informed their scholarly pursuits.

In American education
In 1992 Maryland adopted statewide service-learning requirements for high school graduation.
In the same year, the District of Columbia also adopted such requirements.

A number of other states have allowed credit toward graduation for service-learning/community service.

Learning
Janet Eyler outlines the different ways student learn through service-learning in the book Where's the Learning in Service-Learning?.  First, there is interpersonal learning, in which students re-evaluate personal values and motivations by channeling a passionate interest to service-learning projects, as well as build a connection and commitment to the community.  The second form is academic material that is taught through practical application and reflective instruction, so that it may be practiced outside classrooms and test-taking. Janet Eyler explains, "it is the product of continuous challenge to old conceptions and reflection on new ways to organize information and use the new material."  Thirdly is cognitive development where students are challenged to use critical thinking and problem-solving skills in a context that provides additional information and experience for student evaluation, because service-learning deals with numerous problems in complex situations.  The fourth form is transformation within the students, which "is about thinking about things in a new way and moving in new direction—creating a new picture without relying on the old lines."  Finally, service-learning focuses on effective citizenship and behavioral issues, and this helps the students better understand social issues relevant to their own community.  Learning in all these ways makes service-learning effective to those serving as well as those being served, for "learning begins with the impact of service-learning on the personal and interpersonal development of the students."

According to Janet Eyler and Dwight E. Giles, there are numerous benefits to the service-learning approach. It provides experiential learning that connects personal and interpersonal development with cognitive and academic advancement,  providing opportunities for personal connections and ultimately transformation. Those serving may encounter certain social problems for the first time, thus transforming their view on the world. Beyond that, students may be transformed in the way of developing better problem-solving skills to address those problems about which they now know. A service-learning experience may be the catalyst in the life of a student to dive into the complexities of the social issues they have encountered and to seek to develop innovative solutions.
 It is important to point out the importance of the role of reflection in service-learning. The hyphen in between the service and learning links to the key role of reflection or “learning” after the physical act of service has taken place.

Service learning combines both experiential learning and community service.

For students to receive college credit for service-learning courses, a substantial amount of academic learning must accompany the service. Janet Eyler outlines several impacts of learning that she believes evolves from service-learning. The first impact is Personal Connections. When a person is passionate about a certain topic or cause, they are likely want to make a difference by trying to mend help in that area. Lifelong learners develop from students who are personally connected with their passion. Secondly, the usefulness of service-learning, according to Eyler, can impact a student for the rest of their lives. Eyler points that learning the material for a test or exam in a classroom is one thing, but actually pulling that knowledge out and using it in new circumstances or in problems that arise in everyday life is another thing. Students have the chance to practice what they learn in the classroom by encountering life problems and have a chance to develop skill in how to develop solutions for the problems they face. The development of learning is the third impact that Eyler explains. She writes that much of the knowledge that students have is not self-consumed, but rather developed from training obtained from the classroom and from daily life. Any thought or active development attained during service is more liable to impact the student, and the students' surroundings.  The fourth impact that Eyler explains is the transformational aspect of service-learning. Students who participate in service are likely to develop different ways of thinking and approaching life. It may be a service-learning course that impacts the students' frame of thinking, while transforming the community as well. Finally, the fifth impact of learning is finding citizenship in our communities. While the students are serving and impacting the community, they are very likely to find their role in society. Students can realize that they can make a difference and do have a part in their community. This realization can lead to citizenship, and active and acknowledged place in community. These five by-products of learning, as Janet Eyler outlines, are important to the progression of learning in service-learning.

Factors 
According to Eyler and Giles Jr., who conducted nationwide studies on service-learning, factors that influence its impact on students include placement quality, duration, and reflection. A recent sample study assessed the benefits of service learning in undergraduate public health education course using the Civic Attitudes and Skills Questionnaire. Overall, students reported increases in their civic attitudes and skills. However, individuals reporting poor team dynamics consistently reported lower levels of improvement than those reporting great team dynamics.

Placement quality 
According to Eyler and Giles, "Placement quality refers to the extent that students in their community placements are challenged, are active rather than observers, do a variety of tasks, feel that they are making a positive contribution, have important levels of responsibility, and receive input and appreciation from supervisors in the field." According to their research, placement quality has measurable effects on such things as "personal development outcomes," "increased leadership and communication skill," and connection to community, faculty, and other students.

Duration 
In The Importance of Program Quality in Service-Learning, Eyler and Giles state: "a program or a sequence of experiences needs to be of a long enough duration to have a developmental impact." This view is expanded upon by Alexander W. Astin and Linda J. Sax. In their opinion, "the amount of time devoted to providing service carries additional benefits beyond those benefits associated with the type of service performed, especially in the areas of civic responsibility and life skill development."

But how much time is enough? According to J. Beth Mabry, "students should spend at least fifteen to nineteen hours in their service activities to have adequate exposure to the people and issues their service addresses."

Reflection 
An essential feature of service-learning programs, reflection is a period of critical thinking performed by the student. For many advocates of the pedagogy, reflection may symbolize the learning that occurs in the student. Janet Eyler and Dwight E. Giles provide an example of this opinion in their book, Where's the Learning in Service-Learning? when they state: "learning occurs through a cycle of action and reflection, not simply through being able to recount what has been learned through reading and lecture." Also, the National Service Learning Clearinghouse considers reflection a "core component" of service-learning.

Some higher education programs require a reflection component in their service-learning classes. The University of Minnesota is one such institution that includes required reflection activities with its service learning classes.

Reflection may be done individually or as a group activity. Wartburg College in Indiana published a list of reflection activity suggestions on their website. These included various types of journaling, brainstorming as a group, using quotes, writing essays and papers, structured class discussions, and class presentations among other ideas.

Effective service-learning programs also include required written reflection. Not only does writing permanently record a student's service-learning experience, but it also provides a helpful tool for continued reflection long after the program has been completed. Written reflection assignments also require students to stop, think, and articulate their learning. This evaluation is of incredible value to students.

Service
High quality placements are a key to the success of a service-learning program. This requires the service learning establishment to have a broad network of connections within the community. Students must have a positive connection with the establishment they serve, to maximize their learning.

Diversity is also a component of a successful service-learning program. By working with people of different ethnicities, lifestyles, and socioeconomic statuses, a student's learning and tolerance increases. By serving in a diverse learning environment, student are more likely to reduce stereotypes and increase their cultural appreciation. This can help a student learn how to more effectively serve a broader array of people.

The Service in Service Learning takes knowledge outside the classroom into the real world with real people and situations.  In his book Banker to the Poor: Micro-lending and the Battle Against World Poverty, Muhammad Yunus states that "If a university is a repository for knowledge, then some of this knowledge should spill over to the neighboring community. A university must not be an island where academics reach out to higher and higher levels of knowledge without sharing any of their findings."

Service brings community together as a whole, towards a common goal or purpose. Service is about what is for someone else. The action of service in and among the community, provides challenges to sociocultural norms and prejudices. While some have questioned the positive effect and collective interest of the service side of service-learning, among those who perform the services, many disagree.

Effects
Based upon various studies, students who participate in service-learning courses or projects seem to encounter a multitude of benefits. The book Where's the Learning in Service-Learning? discusses the effects of service learning on students, as well service learning in general.

Effects on the student

In addition to interpersonal skills students have also reported developing personal leadership skills. Another benefit seen is that it can also develop a sense of meaning and purpose in their academics. 
  In their book titled, “ Where’s the Learning in Service-Learning” authors Janet Eyler and Dwight E. Giles Jr. claim that learning is most effective when students not only employ their cognitive processes to education but also their affective thought processes and emotions. It is common belief that what excites passions, interests, and convictions influences not only a person's vocation but what they chose to continue learning about. HuffPost Contributor Marcia Y. Cantarella wrote in an article titled, Just Not Feeling it — Or When You Don’t Love a Subject You Have to Take, that students are more focused on the relationship of what they are studying and what they plan to do for a job in their future. She expounds on this topic by encouraging students who are struggling with studying subjects they couldn't care less about to relate them to personal experiences or problems they are having in their life at that moment. Thereby confirming the purpose of service-learning as one of the greatest teachers in real-life lessons that stick with students for many years. 
Though one might not immediately think of serving others as affecting oneself, studies have found that "coming into contact with people whose life experiences and assumptions about the world are different calls one's own world into question." Not only does the service experience move one to examine his own life, but it also allows him to produce a better version of himself. In their book, Where's the Learning in Service-Learning? Janet Eyler and Dwight E. Giles Jr. identify five key personal growth outcomes of service-learning: self-knowledge, spiritual growth, the reward of helping others, career benefits and careers in service, and changes in personal efficacy. As one goes out into the community with the intent of reaching out to those within it, this broader social context causes one to see himself more clearly.

Being involved in the educational process of service-learning also strengthens critical thinking and problem-solving skills, which is vital to facing modern-day dilemmas. This can transform a person's way of thinking, for critical thinking stimulates people to question assumptions and innovate. According to Eyler and Giles Jr., "Transformative thinking is about thinking about things in a new way and moving in new directions—creating a new picture without relying on the old lines."

It is in this way that service-learning motivates individuals to become better citizens of their communities. Many of those interested in reforming higher education have found that this experiential pedagogy helps to "cultivate civic and social responsibility as part of education for citizenship." As individuals acquire knowledge about serving those around them, they can apply that knowledge to community problems, thus being able to make a greater difference in the world. People who realize their responsibility to their community naturally develop into more productive members of society.

Service learning advocates maintain that service-learning begins in the heart and mind of the individual, who must understand themselves before attempting to understand others. This prompts them to develop personal connections with those they serve.

Researchers have found that these personal and interpersonal gains from engaging in service-learning classes where higher when the programs were of better quality. The biggest predictor of increased learning in communication skills was the high placement quality that the students were put into, allowing them to develop and "hone" their skills.

Many experience interpersonal development through the service learning process. According to Where's the Learning in Service-Learning?, among the students in their survey, "40 percent reported that learning to work with others was among the most important things they learned from service-learning, and 81 percent indicated that it was the most or very important." Learning to work with others is crucial for job placement in our world today. Another effect this has on the students is that they are more apt to learn how to lead. By working with others, the students are given opportunities to be more responsible and take initiative. Service-learning also encourages connection within the community. Truly, many learned how to listen to the voice of their communities. Not only that, but it helps form friendships and find other like-minded individuals who are involved with service learning. Above all it helps students to feel as though they are making a difference and matter to their communities. It was also found that quantity and quality of reflective discussion was linked to the outcome of feeling a closeness among the community and other students. An even more powerful outcome was the creation of a bond between a student and faculty member. In most classroom settings there's little room for a deep relationship between the student and teacher, while in service-learning often student and teacher work alongside each other and develop a more lasting bond. As stated in Where's the Learning in Service-Learning?, "Service participants in their assessment of Learn and Serve America were more likely than their peers to spend at least an hour a week interacting with a faculty member." Service-learning has a tremendous impact on students and how they learn, but also how they interact with others.

Diversity awareness

Service-learning offers an opportunity for students to experience different cultures, which in turn reduces many negative and unnecessary stereotypes derived by inexperienced students. The appreciation of different cultures in service-learning happens because of the interaction that often occurs while completing a service. A survey on students who participated in service-learning finds that, "63 percent reported interacting with those receiving services at least fairly often, 60 percent reported frequent interaction with other volunteers, 51 percent felt that professionals at the placement site often took an interest in them, and 57 percent reported that they had frequent chances to work with people from ethnic groups other than their own."

One of the goals of service-learning is positive interactions.

People often only distinguish the differences between other cultures and communities and their own. These perceived differences often influence the decisions made when interacting with people of other cultures. Service-learning provides the opportunity for students to not only appreciate other cultures, but to appreciate their shared humanity.

Effects on community partners
Service learning programs have developed rapidly within the last 30 years. From 1995–1997, 458 universities received grants from the Corporation for National Service's Learn and Serve Higher Education (LASHE). This facilitated development of 3,000 new service-learning courses that benefit an average of more than 60 students per course.

Much of the research on the effects of service-learning is focused on what students learn through their service to the community; fewer studies have been conducted on the impact of service-learning on the communities where the students serve.  Several studies on this topic measure the impact of service-learning on the community organizations that college students volunteer in, seeking to understand the organizations' perspectives on service-learning.

One positive impact of service-learning on these organizations is the presence of more volunteers, which enables the organizations to accomplish more and to serve more clients.  Students can use specific skills they possess to benefit the organization, and can be a source of new ideas, energy, and enthusiasm. Through partnering with a college or university, the organization can gain access to new knowledge and opportunities to connect with other organizations that have partnered with the same school.

In Native American communities
Service-learning has been applied across a host of cultural settings, including numerous Native American communities. Guffey (1997) notes credible service learning begins with tribal ways of knowing and value systems, which is to say that outsiders should not impose service learning projects. Rather, tribal communities should devise projects that reflect needs unique to the community being served. This parallels Matthew Fletcher's (2010) assertion that tribes, and other historically marginalized communities, should unique develop educational programs, as opposed to merely adopting Westernized forms of education.

According to this view, service learning provides a pedagogical framework for tribes to address community needs. One such example is provided by Sykes, Pendley, and Deacon (2017) who provide a qualitative case study of a tribally-initiated service learning project embedded within a partnership at a research university. This case is unique in that it recounts how service learning students (who were also tribal members) came to collectively understand their responsibilities of citizenship through service. Moreover, tribal elders came to appreciate the importance of young citizens in maintaining and growing tribal culture. Thus, service learning can also be a means to explore cultural identity.

Critiques
There are numerous critiques of service-learning. In 1979, Robert Sigmon acknowledged criticisms that called service-learning, "a utopian vision" and "too demanding and impractical." He called for research into outcomes related to service-learning. Towson University Professor John Egger, writing in the Spring 2008 issue of the journal Academic Questions, argued that service learning does not really teach useful skills or develop cultural knowledge. Instead, Egger maintained, service learning mainly involves the inculcation of communitarian political ideologies. Tulane Professor Carl L. Bankston III has described his own university's policy of mandating service learning as the imposition of intellectual conformity by the university administration on both students and faculty. According to Bankston, by identifying specific types of civic engagement as worthy community service, the university was prescribing social and political perspectives. He argued that this was inconsistent with the idea that individuals in a pluralistic society should choose their own civic commitments and that it was contrary to the ideal of the university as a site for the pursuit of truth through the free exchange of ideas.

However, these organizations face challenges in working with the students.  Communication with faculty is often inconsistent, so organizations do not always understand their roles and the roles of the faculty in students' service projects.  Some organizations' representatives stated that faculty assigned students projects that were not allowed in their organization.  Often the demographics of students do not match well with the demographics of the clients they serve, which can make it difficult for the students to relate to the clients or create an uncomfortable situation for the clients.  The academic calendar students follow tends not to work well with the organizations' schedules, since students' volunteering schedules are interrupted for holiday breaks, finals, and other activities. Also, the small number of hours students are required to spend volunteering can cause problems for organizations and their clients.  Some organizations require more hours for volunteer training than students are required to volunteer, and making a personal connection with clients only to break it off soon after can be more hurtful than helpful.

Representatives of community organizations where service-learning students volunteer expressed interest in working with colleges and universities to change service-learning programs so that they work more smoothly for the organizations. Their suggestions included establishing more consistent communication between faculty and organizations, creating longer-term partnerships between colleges and community organizations, and ensuring that the students and their projects are matched well with the organizations they serve.

In Downsizing Democracy: How America Sidelined Its Citizens and Privatized Its Public, Matthew A. Crenson and Benjamin Ginsberg question whether service-learning is contributing to privatizing or downsizing citizenship practices. Responding to this, Christopher Koliba wrote that education providers may have the opportunity to change this trend.

The service aspect of service learning tends to be thought of uncritically as something good. Some scholars argue that service learning in itself only gives students satisfaction without little or no benefit to the communities. Eby makes the claim that traditional service learning has no real connection with communities and their problems. Without addressing the root of social issues, students gain no real understanding of the problems facing the communities in which they volunteer/serve. Instead, they will unknowingly be pawns in the systemic institutions and use their privileges to “preserve” these systems in place.  Service-learning has become popularized but it has less focus on the people and more focus on the individual's “good deeds”.  Another critique of service learning is that the research focus on this sector is mostly done by scholars, while community locals and organizations are left out from the discussion. These community organizations and partners are left without a voice and there is no connection between the academic learning and the service. The emergence of critical service learning as a new sector addresses some of these critiques of traditional service.

Comprehensive Action Plan for Service Learning (CAPSL) 
 CAPSL Identifies four constituencies on which a program for service learning must focus its principal activities: institution, faculty, students, and community.
 CAPSL also identifies a sequence of activities (Planning, awareness, prototype, resources, expansion,; recognition, monitoring, evaluation, research, and institutionalization) to pursue for each of the four constituencies (institution, faculty, students, and community).
 CAPSL provides a heuristic for guiding the development of a service learning program in higher education.
 Advantages of CAPSL: it is general enough that the execution of each cell can be tailored to local conditions.
 Disadvantages of CAPSL: it is not possible to detail how each step can be successfully accomplished to take the sequence of activities from the whole CAPSL model and apply it to any cell in the matrix.

Engineering education

Many engineering faculty members believe the educational solution lies in taking a more constructivist approach, where students construct knowledge and connections between nodes of knowledge as opposed to passively absorbing knowledge.  Educators see service learning as a way to both implement a constructivism in engineering education as well as match the teaching styles to the learning styles of typical engineering students.  As a result, many engineering schools have begun to integrate service learning into their curricula and there is now a journal dedicated to service learning in engineering.

Religious aspects
Service Learning emphasizes the learning process of the experiences we have had or observed and how we then apply it to our lives and thought processes. Jesus Christ of the Christian Gospel not only was benevolent to the world around Him but engaged the suffering by stepping into their misfortune with them. In the New Testament book of Colossian, Apostle Paul writes from a prison cell that “…there’s a lot of suffering to be entered into in this world—the kind of suffering Christ takes on...” (Peterson, Eugene. The Message Bible Remix) This speaks plainly of Jesus’ work but also His walk with suffering people.

In Ephesious 6:6 it says: "Not by way of eyeservice, as man-pleasers, but as servants of Christ, doing the will of God from the heart." Here, and elsewhere in the bible, it says that service must be done for the sake of service itself and not for some material benefit, like receiving a certain number of hours in order to graduate. Service learning, while beneficial to some, turns service on it's head by offering material rewards, in the form of graduation and other honors. Eric Durland calls this "Forced Volunteerism." Where the state, and society, is mandating something that can only be effective that is done out of the kindness of our hearts. It is a contradiction built into the entire service learning program. As is said in Peter 5:2: "Shepherd the flock of God among you, exercising oversight not under compulsion, but voluntarily, according to the will of God; and not for sordid gain, but with eagerness." And many children are learning how to play the system of service learning instead of learning to do service, and that the rewards of service only come from service itself. Instead, they look for the easiest way to get hours of service. They look for the best way to make their resumes look good. They look for the best way to make their college applications look good. Only a minority, as outlined below and elsewhere in this wikipage, are truly providing service for the sake of service, and only some are learning to give service. And, as a result of the bureaucracy and paperwork, they are instead learning to navigate a bureaucracy. 

In Where's the Learning in Service-Learning?, Janet Eyler and Dwight E. Giles Jr. wrote, "Although fewer students chose spiritual growth as an important outcome of service-learning—20 percent selecting it as among the most important things they learned and 46 percent selecting it as very or most important—it was important to many students...Some saw service as a definite opportunity to fulfill their religious commitment."

Service-learning has both a service and a learning component. Eyler and Giles Jr. in Where's the Learning in Service-Learning? apply the term service-learning "to programs where the two foci are in balance, and study and action are explicitly integrated.

Eyler and Giles Jr. have found that service-learning students, upon reflecting on their experience, find reward in helping others and in developing close personal relationships. The second focus in the term service-learning, that of learning, is defined by R. L. Atkinson as "a relatively permanent change in behavior that results from practice."

In addition to the service and learning components stressed by Eyler and Giles, author David Bornstein references motivation in service. In How to Change the World: Social Entrepreneurs and the Power of New Ideas, he states: "The key difference [between highly successful and average entrepreneurs has] more to do with the quality of their motivation."

Service learning is about taking the student out of the classroom and placing them in an environment where they can make a difference while also learning. Service learning strengthens not just the community that is being helped but the person who is giving their time and effort to their cause, which benefits them socially, mentally, emotionally, and spiritually. For many service learning is simply tending to basic human needs: food, water, clothes, and housing. Some organizations, such as The Salvation Army, also seek to attend to the spiritual side of service learning. They used the motto "soup, soap, and salvation" to show what they wanted to do with their ministry. "The Salvation Army sees no conflict between spiritual and social ministry. It seeks to serve people so as to satisfy both the spiritual and social dimensions of their needs."

Critical service learning 
Focusing on a critical service learning approach vs a traditional one, alleviates some of the problems of traditional service learning. With critical service learning, a community aspect and civic responsibility aligns with educational learning, which brings about an excitement and willingness to help out the society and shifts the focus from benefits to the volunteer student alone. Critical service learning allows students to take their learning discourses and use it to connect to their personal experiences  for  social development and the welfare of others  According to Mitchell, there are three different approaches required to achieve a critical learning service status. These are: redistributing power to marginalized groups of people; developing meaningful partnerships with community members/partners and those in the classroom; and, approaching service learning through the lens of making impactful social change. Warren-Gordon, Frank, and Scott add that reflection amongst teachers and students is a significant factor for the critical service learning approach. According to Mitchell, traditional service learning needs seemingly ignore the systemic inequalities embedded in institutional services while critical service learning needs to carefully approach service with a focus on tearing down systemic inequalities. We can see through this sector's history that traditional service learning meets individual needs of volunteers but does not necessarily address the political or social aspect of that need. Critical service learning focus is social justice for marginalized communities and the systemic institutions that placed them where they are. “Critical service learning forces students to see themselves as “agents of social change” and use their experiences of service to address and respond to injustice in their communities”. This sector's main focus is to address political and social power relations and how it leads to the systemic inequalities that marginalized communities face. The goal is to connect students' services to their learning discourses. Critical service learning gives students the chance to ask themselves how their services create political and social change in these communities.

Notable people
One contributor to the study of service learning is Alexander Astin. Astin, the Allan M. Cartter Distinguished Professor of Higher Education Emeritus and founding director of both Cooperative Institutional Research Program and Higher Education Research Institute, formed a Theory of Involvement. This theory explains how student involvement in co-curricular activities positively affects college outcomes. Through a 1998 study of college seniors, Astin demonstrated that service greatly improves critical thinking skills.

Nadinne I. Cruz works as an independent consultant. She gained enthusiasm for the cause of service learning through her work in the Philippines. Now, she is an advocate of service learning who argues that only a small portion of skills needed to address life’s problems can be learned through traditional academia. Other skills, such as courage, forgiveness, and stewarding the earth, must be learned elsewhere. Therefore, she recommends service learning and community engagement, which “offer learning with and from wise people, who teach by example.”

Andrew Furco, Associate Vice President for Public Engagement at the University of Minnesota and a professor, has contributed a variety of literature to service learning, including two books: Service-Learning: The Essence of the Pedagogy and Service-Learning Through a Multidisciplinary Lens, which he co-authored with S. Billig. He gives five reasons engagement programs differ from engaged universities: “Engagement differs from outreach… is at the heart of the university’s identity… focuses on partnerships… is with, not to, for, or in communities… is about institutional transformation.”

One other service-learning notable is James Kielsmeier. Kielsmeier founded the National Youth Leadership Council, a nonprofit that became the service-learning movement. Kielsmeier posits that service learning involves a change in how schools see young people: from “resource users, recipients, and victims” to “contributors, givers, and leaders.”

See also

 Asia-Pacific Regional Conference on Service-Learning
 Campus Compact
 Constructivism
 Cooperative education
 Global Leadership Adventures
 International Service Learning
 Learn and Serve America
 Lifeworks International
 National service
 National Service Learning Conference
 Out-of-school learning
 Public sphere pedagogy
 Youth Service America

References

Further reading
 Pragmatism and Education
 Jane Addams and the Origins of Service-Learning Practice in the United States
 John Dewey and Progressive Education

Community building
Applied learning
Alternative education
School terminology
Education in the United States
Experiential learning
Learning programs